Rhinotermes is a genus of termites typical of the family Rhinotermitidae.  Records of occurrence are largely from South America, but they also heve been found in southern Europe, Africa and on Pacific islands.

Species
The Termite Catalogue and GBIF list the following:
 Rhinotermes hispidus Emerson, 1925
 Rhinotermes manni Snyder, 1924
 Rhinotermes marginalis (Linnaeus, 1758)
 †Rhinotermes miocenicus Nel & Paicheler, 1993
 Rhinotermes nasutus (Perty, 1833)
 Rhinotermes tarakanensis'' Oshima, 1914

References

External links 
 

Termites
Insects of South America